Hypatopa rabio is a moth in the family Blastobasidae. It is found in Costa Rica.

The length of the forewings is 4.1–5.8 mm. The forewings are brown intermixed with a few pale-brown and a few dark-brown scales. The hindwings are translucent pale brown.

Etymology
The specific name is derived from Latin rabies (meaning madness or rage).

References

Moths described in 2013
Hypatopa